Mlangeni is a surname. Notable people with the surname include:

Andrew Mlangeni (1925–2020), South African political activist and campaigner 
Bafana Mlangeni (1967–2015), South African actor
Don Eric Mlangeni, South African actor
Sabelo Mlangeni (born 1980), South African photographer